The Ministry of Animal Resources and Fisheries is now the called the Ministry of Livestock and Fisheries in the newly formed  government of national unity. This ministry was renamed following the formation of Transitional Government of national Unity in 2020. The ministry livestock and fisheries is now the national ministry of the Government of South Sudan. The incumbent minister is Onyeti Adigo Nyikech as per 2022.

List of Animal Resources and Fisheries

References

Animal Resources and Fisheries
South Sudan
South Sudan, Animal Resources and Fisheries
Natural resources in Africa